The International Folklore Children’s Festival "Oro Bez Granici" (Megjunaroden folkloren detski festival "Oro Bez Granici") is a festival taking place every year between 29 September and 2 October in the Universal Hall in Skopje, Republic of North Macedonia. In this festival, children’s folklore ensembles from North Macedonia and abroad participate.

External links 
 Macedonia.co.uk - Events in Macedonia (in English)
 - Ministry of culture of the Republic of Macedonia

Children's festivals in North Macedonia
Festivals in Skopje